Rolando Rigoli (born 3 October 1940) is a retired Italian fencer. He competed at the 1968 and 1972 Olympics in the individual and team sabre events and won a silver and a gold team medal, respectively.

References

External links
 

1940 births
Living people
Italian male fencers
Olympic fencers of Italy
Fencers at the 1968 Summer Olympics
Fencers at the 1972 Summer Olympics
Olympic gold medalists for Italy
Olympic silver medalists for Italy
Olympic medalists in fencing
Sportspeople from Livorno
Medalists at the 1968 Summer Olympics
Medalists at the 1972 Summer Olympics